Munshi is an Indian Malayalam-language political and social satire television programme on the Malayalam-language news channel Asianet News. The show is directed by Anil Banerjee; it has aired continuously since September 2000. Earlier it was aired on Asianet.

Although the original idea during the show's inception was "giving a visualised treatment to pocket cartoons", after about 300 episodes, it "deviate[d] to the path of politics".

Characters

Characters are sketched such that they come from a widely different backgrounds, with different political and religious outlooks. It sets a secular atmosphere in the show.

 Munshi - the khadi-clad central character
 School student - seen with a Pazhampori in his hand
 Kariyachan - seen with neck brace
 Panicker - always wearing formals
 Motta - carrying a rooster in his hands
 Hajiyar - carries an umbrella
 Thirumeni - a Hindu priest
 Sakhavu - a comrade who addresses everyone else as 'Sakhavu'
 President

Format
Each episode takes up a social or political topic that is part of the current affairs. The characters, who belong to different socio-political backgrounds, narrates their opinion on the issue. The three-to-five minute strip ends with Munshi stating his view on the topic, often with a quirky proverb or pithy quote. The Munshi never takes part in others' discussion, his sole role is in delivering the final comment.
The show begins and ends with a rooster's cock-a-doodle-do sound.

Cast and crew
 Munshi was initially played by KP Sivasankara Kurup for the first 10 years of the show. He was replaced by Achuthath Vasudevan Krishnan Moosad.
 School student - Shreeju Nedumangad
 Kariyachan - Ayyappan
 Panicker - Sreekumar
 Hajiyar - Rajendran
 Sakhavu - Madhu Elavattom
 Motta - Hari
 Cameraman - Ajai Kumar G R

References

2000 Indian television series debuts
2010s Indian television series
Malayalam-language television
Indian political television series